Tikoloshanes eretiformis is a species of beetle in the family Dytiscidae, the only species in the genus Tikoloshanes. This species has rarely been collected and is known only from South Africa and southern Mozambique.

References

Dytiscidae